Cracovia is a multi-sports club in Kraków, Poland. Its teams include:

Cracovia (football)
Cracovia (handball)
Cracovia (ice hockey)

MKS Cracovia
Multi-sport clubs in Poland
Sports clubs in Poland